A Way of Life is the début album by British vocal harmony and folk rock group The Family Dogg. It features singer-songwriter Albert Hammond, and a session group includes Led Zeppelin's John Paul Jones, Jimmy Page, and John Bonham. Elton John may have played piano on the title track. Released by the UK subsidiary of Bell Records in November, 1969, the album was reissued in 1995 as a CD with bonus tracks, which included B-sides and songs found on other compilation and sampler records.

Track listing 
"Julie's Just Gone" (Mark Jordan) – 3:20
"All the Best Songs and Marches" (Terry Stamp) – 2:31
"In the Ghetto" (Mac Davis) – 3:06
"Today I Killed a Man I Didn't Know" (Roger Cook, Roger Greenaway) – 4:13
"Pattern People" (Jimmy Webb) – 2:40
"Save the Life of My Child" (Paul Simon) – 4:45
"Love Minus Zero/No Limit" (Bob Dylan) – 2:54
"Reflections 'Of Your Face'" (Amory Kane) – 4:05
"Run Run Run Fly Fly Fly" (Ben Findon) – 2:47
"Moonshine Mary" (Albert Hammond, Mike Hazlewood) – 3:26
"You Were On My Mind" (Traditional; arranged by Kane, Rowland, Hammond, Hazlewood) – 4:37
"A Place in the Sun" (Bryan Wells, Ronald Miller) – 4:55
"A Way of Life" (Roger Cook, Roger Greenaway) – 4:04

Personnel 
Steve Rowland – Lead vocals (tracks 1, 3-9, 11, 13), backing vocals, congas, producer
Albert Hammond – Lead vocals (tracks 4-7, 9, 11-13), backing vocals, 12-string guitar
Mike Hazelwood – Lead vocals (tracks 2, 5, 7), backing vocals, acoustic guitar
Christine Holmes – Lead vocals (track 5), backing vocals
Pam "Zooey" Quinn – Lead vocals (track 10), backing vocals
Doreen De Veuve – vocals (uncredited)
Jimmy Page – Electric guitars (tracks 4, 11, 13)
John Paul Jones – Bass guitar, arranger (tracks 4, 8, 11)
Amory Kane – guitar, fills between every track
John Bonham – Drums
Alan Parker – Acoustic guitar
Alan "Hawk" Hawkshaw – Piano, organ
Clem Cattini – Drums
Big Jim Sullivan – Arranger, guitar (uncredited)
Elton John – Piano (track 13, uncredited)
Bette Wernick (nee Ellis)- Backing Vocals (track 13)
Stan Barrett – Percussion
Denis Lopez – Percussion
Phil Dennys – Arranger
Reg Tilsey – Arranger
Ken Woodman – Arranger
Damon Lyon Shaw – Engineer (IBC Studios)
John Iles – Engineer (Chappell Studios)
John Timperley– Engineer (Chappell Studios)
John Mackswith – Engineer (Landsdowne Studios)
Mike Weighell – Engineer (Landsdowne Studios)

Chart positions

Album

Singles

References

1969 debut albums
The Family Dogg albums
Bell Records albums
Albums produced by Steve Rowland (record producer)
Albums arranged by John Paul Jones (musician)
Albums arranged by Big Jim Sullivan
Albums recorded at IBC Studios